Sir William Frederick Payne Heseltine,  (born 17 July 1930) is a former Private Secretary to Queen Elizabeth II. He was in office from 1986 to 1990.

Biography
Heseltine was born at Wyalkatchem, Western Australia, in 1930. He was educated at Richmond Primary School, Christ Church Grammar School, Claremont, Western Australia, and the University of Western Australia, where he received a 1st class BA (Hons) in history. Heseltine joined the Prime Minister's Department (Australia) in 1951, where he remained until 1962. He was Private Secretary to Sir Robert Menzies, Prime Minister (1955–1959), and Acting Official Secretary to The 1st Viscount De L'Isle, Governor-General, May to August 1962. In 1960–1961, he was temporary Assistant Press Secretary to the Queen.

From 1962–1964 he was Assistant Federal Director of the Liberal Party of Australia, and in 1964 was attached to The Age (Melbourne). In the same year, he was attached to Princess Marina for her tour of Australia. Heseltine joined the Press Office of The Royal Household as Assistant Press Secretary to the Queen in 1965–1967. He was Press Secretary 1968–1972.

In 1972, Heseltine was moved to the Private Secretary's Office proper, becoming Assistant Private Secretary. In 1977, he was promoted to Deputy Private Secretary and, in April 1986, to Private Secretary to the Sovereign, and Keeper of the Queen's Archives. He retired in October 1990.

He was appointed an Extra Equerry while Deputy Private Secretary to the Queen. He has been a company director from 1991, including chairman of NZI Insurance Australia Ltd 1992 (deputy 1991–1992); director of NZI Insurance New Zealand 1996; P&O Australia Ltd 1990–; and West Coast Telecasters Ltd 1991–1996.

Appointments
 Privy Counsellor, 1986 (PC)
 Honorary Doctorate, Murdoch University, 1992.

Retirement 
On leaving Royal service, Sir William retired to the historic town of York in his native Western Australia.

Honours

References

1930 births
Living people
Companions of the Order of Australia
Companions of the Queen's Service Order
Australian Knights Grand Cross of the Royal Victorian Order
Australian Knights Grand Cross of the Order of the Bath
Recipients of the Grand Decoration for Services to the Republic of Austria
Australian members of the Privy Council of the United Kingdom
Private Secretaries to the Sovereign
Deputy Private Secretaries to the Sovereign
Assistant Private Secretaries to the Sovereign
Australian monarchists
University of Western Australia alumni